Henk Nijhof (born 8 April 1952) is a Dutch politician and former educator. He is a member of GreenLeft (GroenLinks). From 2006 to 2012 he was Party Chair.

As a PSP politician he was a councillor from 1982 to 1986. From 1994 to 2006 he was an alderman of Hengelo on behalf of GreenLeft.

References 
 Equivalent article on the Dutch Wikipedia.

External links 
  GreenLeft website

1952 births
Living people
Aldermen in Overijssel
Dutch educators
GroenLinks politicians
Pacifist Socialist Party politicians
Chairmen of GroenLinks
People from Hengelo